Bill Tilden defeated Frank Hunter in the final, 3–6, 6–3, 4–6, 6–2, 6–4 to win the men's singles tennis title at the 1929 U.S. National Championships. It was Tilden's seventh and last U.S. Championships singles title, and ninth major singles title overall.

Henri Cochet was the reigning champion, but did not compete this year.

Seeds
The tournament used two lists of players for seeding the men's singles event; one list of eight U.S. players and one list of six foreign players. Bill Tilden is the champion; others show the round in which they were eliminated.

  Bill Tilden (champion)
  George Lott (third round)
  Francis Hunter (finalist)
  John Doeg (semifinals)
  John Van Ryn (quarterfinals)
  Berkeley Bell (third round)
  Fritz Mercur (semifinals)
  Gregory Mangin (second round)
  Bunny Austin (quarterfinals)
  Norman Farquharson (second round)
  John Olliff (third round)
  Tamio Abe (fourth round)
  E.R. Avory (third round)
  Germán Upmann (second round)

Draw

Final eight

Earlier rounds

Section 1

References

Men's singles
1929